Anselmo Braamcamp Freire (Lisbon, February 1, 1849 – Lisbon, December 23, 1921) was a Portuguese historian, genealogist and politician. A member of the National Constituent Assembly, he became the first president of the (Second) Portuguese Senate. While a historian, he authored a notable study of the life of Vasco da Gama. His house in Santarém is now the city's municipal library.

References

1849 births
1921 deaths
20th-century Portuguese politicians
20th-century Portuguese historians
19th-century Portuguese historians
Genealogists
Mayors of Lisbon

People from Lisbon
Portuguese people of Italian descent
Portuguese Republican Party politicians
Presidents of the Portuguese Senate